Boxer most commonly refers to:
Boxer (boxing), a competitor in the sport of boxing
Boxer (dog), a breed of dog

Boxer or boxers may also refer to:

Animal kingdom
Boxer crab
Boxer shrimp, a small group of decapod crustaceans
Boxer snipe eel, Nemichthys curvirostris

Film and television
Boxer TV Access, a Swedish digital TV provider
Boxer (1984 film), a 1984 Hindi-language film
Boxer (2015 film), a 2015 Kannada-language film
Boxer (2018 film)  a 2018 Bengali-language film
The Boxer (1997 film), a 1997 film starring Daniel Day-Lewis
The Boxer (1958 film), a 1958 Mexican sports drama film
The Boxer (2012 film), a 2012 short film starring Paul Barber
The Boxer, aka Ripped Off, a 1972 Italian film starring Robert Blake and Ernest Borgnine
 The Boxers, a Hong Kong film of 1973

Military
Boxer (armoured fighting vehicle), a European, multi-role, armoured vehicle
Boxer Rebellion, a 1900 armed conflict in China
 Boxer movement, participants in the Boxer Rebellion
HMS Boxer, nine ships of the Royal Navy, 1797–2004
USS Boxer, six US Navy ships
Operation Boxer, a 1969 series of Israeli air attacks on Egyptian targets near the Suez Canal

Music
Boxer (band), a rock band formed in 1975
Boxer (The National album), 2007
Boxer (Johannes Oerding album), 2011
"Boxers" (song), a 1995 song by Morrissey
"The Boxer", a 1968 song by Simon & Garfunkel
The Boxer (album), by Kele Okereke,  2010
"The Boxer" (The Chemical Brothers song), 2005
"Boxer", a 2004 song by Sara Groves from the album The Other Side of Something
"The Boxer", a 2009 song by Editors from the album In This Light and on This Evening
"The Boxer", a 2001 song by Carbon Leaf from the album Echo Echo

People
Boxer (surname)
BoxeR (Lim Yo-hwan, born 1980), professional StarCraft player

Transport and engineering
Boxer engine, a type of internal combustion engine
Peugeot Boxer, a van
Ferrari Berlinetta Boxer, a sports car

Other
Boxer shorts or Boxer briefs, two styles of male undergarment based on shorts
Boxer (grape), another name for the German wine grape Bukettraube
Boxer (magazine), a magazine printed in Turkey
Boxer (Animal Farm), a character in George Orwell's Animal Farm
Balrog (Street Fighter), a Street Fighter character often called Boxer
 Boxers (graphic novel), by Gene Luen Yang, 2013
 The Boxers (sculpture), a 1987 work by Keith Haring in Berlin, Germany
Boxer at Rest, a Hellenistic Greek sculpture created between 330 and 50 BCE
Boxer Codex, a manuscript written circa 1595 containing illustrations depicting the inhabitants of the Philippines at the time of their contact with Spaniards
Boxer disease or Dementia pugilistica, chronic  brain injury caused by blows to the head
Boxer primer, a type of centerfire primer in ballistics

See also
Boxing (disambiguation)